Kutuzov may refer to:

Kutuzov (surname)
 Kutuzovsky Avenue in Moscow, Russia
 Kutuzov Embankment in Saint Petersburg, Russia
 Kutuzov Island (Daxitong Dao), on the Ussuri River, Russia
 Operation Kutuzov, military operation (battle) in World War II
 Order of Kutuzov, military award
 Soviet cruiser Mikhail Kutuzov, a Soviet (and later Russian) cruiser of the Black Sea Fleet from 1954 to 2000
 2492 Kutuzov, (also known as 2492 (1977 NT) Kutuzov and 1977 NT), a main belt asteroid
 Kutuzov (film), a 1943 Soviet drama film